Namibia – United States relations are bilateral relations between Namibia and the United States.

History 
During the South African Border War, the United States mediated in bringing to fruition the Tripartite Accord which committed to a withdrawal of Cuban and South African military personnel from Angola and South West Africa (present-day Namibia) respectively. The United States recognized Namibia on 21 March 1990 soon after obtaining independence from South Africa. The U.S. Liaison Office at Windhoek was elevated to an embassy. 

Relations between both nations are friendly. The United States participated in the diplomatic efforts to bring about Namibia’s 1990 independence from South Africa and has since worked to strengthen political, economic, and people-to-people ties. The bilateral relationship is characterized by a shared commitment to democratic principles, including the rule of law, respect for human rights, independence of the judiciary, and freedom of the press. The United States and Namibia are partners in the effort to combat HIV/AIDS, stem wildlife trafficking and promote conservation, and expand trade and development opportunities.

Resident diplomatic missions

 Namibia has an embassy in Washington, D.C.
 United States has an embassy in Windhoek.

See also
 Namibian Americans
Index of Namibia-related articles

References

Further reading
 Davies, J. E.  Constructive Engagement? Chester Crocker and American Policy in  South Africa, Namibia and Angola 1981-1988 (2008)
 Mitchell, Nancy. Jimmy Carter in Africa: Race and the Cold War (Stanford UP, 2016), 913pp.   excerpt

External links
 History of Namibia - U.S. relations
US Policy on Namibia from the Dean Peter Krogh Foreign Affairs Digital Archives

 
United States
Bilateral relations of the United States